Nationality words link to articles with information on the nation's poetry or literature (for instance, Irish or France).

Events
May 4 – Eibhlín Dubh Ní Chonaill composes the keen Caoineadh Airt Uí Laoghaire over the body of her husband Art Ó Laoghaire.
Cláudio Manuel da Costa writes his epic poem Vila Rica, relating the history of the homonymous Brazilian city, modern-day Ouro Preto; it is not published until 1839.
Friedrich Gottlieb Klopstock publishes the last five cantos of his epic poem Der Messias in Hamburg.
William Cowper, living at Olney, Buckinghamshire, experiences mental disturbances, believing himself condemned to damnation.

Works published

 Anna Laetitia Barbauld, Poems
 Thomas Day, The Dying Negro, Occasioned by the incident, as described in the advertisement published with the poem, about "A black who, a few days before, had run away from his master, and got himself christened, with intent to marry a white woman, his fellow-servant, being taken and sent on board a ship in the Thames, took an opportunity of shooting himself through the head"; a very popular poem, one of the earliest anti-slavery works of literature in Britain, with co-author John Bicknell
 Johannes Ewald, Rungsteds Lyksaligheder
 Robert Fergusson:
 Auld Reikie
 Poems (see also Poems on Various Subjects 1779)
 Richard Graves, The Love of Order, published anonymously
 Edward Jerningham, Faldoni and Teresa
 George Keate, The Monument in Arcadia
 James Macpherson, translator, The Iliad, from the original Ancient Greek of Homer's Iliad
 William Mason, An Heroic Epistle o Sir William Chambers
 Samuel Mather, "The Sacred Minister", English, Colonial America
 Hannah More, A Search after Happinesss, "by a young lady"
 Thomas Scott (of Ipswich), Lyric Poems, Devotional and Moral, the book includes most of the author's poems
 Phillis Wheatley, Poems on Various Subjects, Religious and Moral, the first book of poetry by an American slave, including "On Being Brought from Africa to America". The book was published in Aldgate, London because publishers in Boston, Massachusetts, had refused to publish the text. Wheatley and her master's son, Nathanial Wheatley, went to London, where Selina, Countess of Huntingdon and the Earl of Dartmouth helped with the publication.
 John Wolcot, Persian Love Elegies

Births
Death years link to the corresponding "[year] in poetry" article:
 May 31 – Ludwig Tieck (died 1853), German poet, translator, editor, novelist and critic
 August 21 – Jens Christian Djurhuus (died 1853), Faroese poet
 December 9 – Robert Treat Paine Jr. (died 1811), American poet and editor (son of Robert Treat Paine, signer of the Declaration of Independence)
 Joseph Harris (Gomer) (died 1825), Welsh Baptist minister, poet, writer and editor

Deaths
Birth years link to the corresponding "[year] in poetry" article:
 March 5 – Philip Francis (born 1708), Irish-born English translator of the works of Horace, poet, playwright and clergyman
 March 24 – Philip Stanhope, 4th Earl of Chesterfield (Lord Chesterfield) (born 1694) English statesman and man of letters
 August 3 – Stanisław Konarski (actual name: Hieronim Konarski) (born 1700), Polish pedagogue, educational reformer, political writer, poet, dramatist, Piarist monk and precursor of the Polish Enlightenment
 August 24 – George Lyttelton, 1st Baron Lyttelton (born 1709), English statesman, patron of the arts and poet
 September 18 – John Cunningham (born 1729), Irish-born poet, dramatist and actor, working in Newcastle upon Tyne (England)
 November 7 – Andrew Brice (born 1690), English printer and writer
 November 16 – John Hawkesworth (born c. 1715), English editor and poet

See also

 List of years in poetry
 List of years in literature
 18th century in poetry
 18th century in literature
 French literature of the 18th century
 Sturm und Drang (the conventional translation is "Storm and Stress"; a more literal translation, however, might be "storm and urge", "storm and longing", "storm and drive" or "storm and impulse"), a movement in German literature (including poetry) and music from the late 1760s through the early 1780s
 List of years in poetry
 Poetry

Notes

18th-century poetry
Poetry